Deutschland Tournee 1976 is a 6-CD box-set released by the British hard rock band Rainbow in 2006, featuring live material from 3 concerts of the band's German tour of 1976, being Cologne on 25 September 1976, Düsseldorf on 27 September 1976, and Nürnberg on 28 September 1976. The complete set of 6 CDs was released only in Japan as a box-set. In Europe all three concerts would be released subsequently as separate double-CD sets, in jewel-cases, with the same track listings and CD timings.
 
"Over the Rainbow" was an introduction from the 1939 movie The Wizard of Oz that featured spoken line: "Toto, I've a feeling we're not in Kansas anymore. We must be over the rainbow!"

Track listing
All songs written by Ritchie Blackmore and Ronnie James Dio, except where noted.

Cologne

Düsseldorf

Nürnberg

Personnel
Ritchie Blackmore – guitar
Ronnie James Dio – lead vocals
Cozy Powell – drums, percussion
Jimmy Bain – bass
Tony Carey – keyboard

Rainbow (rock band) live albums
2006 live albums
Virgin Records live albums